Mutzschen is a former town in the Leipzig district, in the Free State of Saxony, Germany. It is situated 13 km east of Grimma, and 21 km northwest of Döbeln. With effect from 1 January 2012, it has been incorporated into the town of Grimma.

References 

Former municipalities in Saxony
Grimma